Doctor Ela Lodh (also spelt as Ila Lodh, died 2021 at 79) was an Indian obstetrician and gynaecologist. She received the 2020 Nari Shakti Puraskar posthumously on 8 March 2022.

Career 
Ela Lodh was born in Khowai in the Indian state of Tripura. Qualified as an obstetrician and gynaecologist, she worked for the Tripura Health Service, eventually becoming administrative director. She held the post from 1990 until 2000 and was also the founder of the Hepatitis Foundation of Tripura. She died of cardiac arrest in a private hospital in Kolkata on 19 July 2021.

Awards and recognition 
Lodh received the 2020 Nari Shakti Puraskar posthumously on 8 March 2022. Her son received the award on her behalf from Prime Minister Narendra Modi.

References 

20th-century births
2021 deaths
People from Tripura
Indian obstetricians
Women from Tripura
Indian gynaecologists
Nari Shakti Puraskar winners